Andrés Matías Fresenga Cúneo (born 13 October 1992) is a Canadian professional soccer player who last played as a defender for Cerro Largo.

Club career

Youth
Fresenga started playing soccer for local team Toronto Argentina at age 4 before moving to his parents' native Uruguay in 2007 and joining Club Nacional de Futbol and helping them win the Uruguayan U16 Championship his first year. Fresenga moved to a new club each year for the following two seasons, including a year with Danubio FC during which he won the Uruguayan U17 Championship in 2008 and a year with the U23 squad of Racing Club de Montevideo.

Racing Club
After one season, he joined Racing Club's First Division squad in 2010, playing through the 2013 season. In January 2013, Fresenga trialed with Vancouver Whitecaps FC of Major League Soccer in his native Canada during the club's preseason as a potential successor to Young-Pyo Lee following his imminent retirement. The club made contact with Canadian Soccer Association technical director Tony Fonseca about the player's availability after his impressive displays during 2012 Olympic qualifying. However, he was ultimately not signed by the club because of an injury and was eventually left without a club.

Ottawa Fury
On 10 January 2014, it was announced that Fresenga had joined Ottawa Fury FC of the North American Soccer League on a one-year deal. The deal came about because Martin Nash, long time Whitecaps player and staff member, recommended the player to Ottawa as they assembled a roster for the club's inaugural season in the NASL following Fresenga's trial with Vancouver. Fresenga made his league debut for Ottawa on 19 April 2014 against Minnesota United FC. He came on as a substitute for Omar Jarun and played the final twelve minutes of the 1–2 defeat.

Woodbridge Strikers
On 12 April 2015, Fresenga signed with the Woodbridge Strikers in League1 Ontario. The club went on to win the League1 Cup and finish runners-up in league play.

Toronto Croatia
For the remainder of the season he played in the Canadian Soccer League with Toronto Croatia. Where he won the CSL Championship after defeating SC Waterloo by a score of 1–0.

Canadian
In 2016, Fresenga returned to Uruguay and signed with Uruguayan Segunda División club Canadian S.C.

Cerro Largo
In 2017, Fresenga signed with Cerro Largo. He made his debut on 4 June 2017 against Cerrito.

Loan to Suchitepéquez
In June 2017, Fresenga joined Guatemalan Liga Nacional side Suchitepéquez on loan.

International career
Fresenga is eligible to represent either Canada or Uruguay internationally.

Fresenga made his international debut for Canada as part of the youth squad which competed at the 2011 CONCACAF U-20 Championship in Guatemala. He was also part of the squad that finished 4th during the 2012 CONCACAF Men's Olympic Qualifying Tournament.

Fresenga was invited to the final training camp of 2013 and first training camp of 2014 for the senior Canadian national team in the United States and Spain respectively. On June 6, 2017 Fresenga was named to Canada's 40-man provisional squad for the 2017 CONCACAF Gold Cup.

Personal life
Fresenga was born in Toronto, Ontario to Uruguayan parents from Pando in the Canelones Department.

References

External links

Ottawa Fury FC profile

1992 births
Living people
Association football defenders
Canadian soccer players
Soccer players from Toronto
Canadian people of Uruguayan descent
Sportspeople of Uruguayan descent
Canadian expatriate soccer players
Expatriate footballers in Uruguay
Canadian expatriate sportspeople in Uruguay
Expatriate footballers in Guatemala
Canadian expatriate sportspeople in Guatemala
Racing Club de Montevideo players
Ottawa Fury FC players
Toronto Croatia players
Canadian Soccer Club players
Cerro Largo F.C. players
C.D. Suchitepéquez players
Uruguayan Primera División players
North American Soccer League players
League1 Ontario players
Canadian Soccer League (1998–present) players
Uruguayan Segunda División players
Liga Nacional de Fútbol de Guatemala players
Canada men's youth international soccer players
Canada men's under-23 international soccer players
Woodbridge Strikers players